Elopak is a Norwegian company producing cartons for liquids, starting with aseptic gable top cartons for milk. The company was founded in 1957 by Johan Henrik Andresen and Christian August Johansen as a European licensee of Pure-Pak, the Elopak name standing for European License Of PURE-PAK. In 1987, Elopak bought the Ex-Cell-O Packaging Systems Division from which it was originally a licensee, and hence got full ownership of Pure-Pak.

In 2003, the company had approximately 2,500 employees and a revenue of about 4 billion Norwegian Kroner, and is the world's third largest supplier of packaging for beverages.

All production now takes place outside Norway. The company's headquarters are in Spikkestad.

The company is currently owned by the investment company Ferd AS.

References

External links
Official home page

Packaging companies of Norway
Manufacturing companies established in 1957
1957 establishments in Norway